Mohammad Saqib Bhatti  (born 18 June 1985) is a British Conservative Party politician who has been the Member of Parliament (MP) for Meriden since the 2019 general election. He has been the Vice Chairman of the Conservative Party for Business since September 2022.

Early life and career
Bhatti is of Pakistani ancestry. He is an accountant by profession.
In 2018 he became the President of the Greater Birmingham Chambers of Commerce, becoming the youngest person and first Muslim to hold the post.

Political career
Bhatti founded the group Muslims for Britain which campaigned for the UK to leave the EU during the Brexit referendum. He argued that EU policy prevented immigration from South Asia and that leaving the EU would make it easier.
 he was a senior policy adviser with the Alliance of Conservatives and Reformists in Europe.

After Caroline Spelman announced she was standing down as an MP, Bhatti was selected to represent the Conservative seat of Meriden at the 2019 general election, beating the political adviser Nick Timothy in the ballot of party members. Saqib was appointed Private Parliamentary Secretary Liz Truss, the then Secretary of State to the Department for International Trade in 2020. He then moved to the Department for Health and Social Care where he served as Private Parliamentary Secretary to the Secretary of State, the Rt Hon. Sajid Javid MP, whom he followed in resigning on 5 July 2022 in the aftermath of the Chris Pincher scandal. On 30 September 2022, Bhatti became the Conservative Party's Vice Chair for Business.

Honours
Bhatti was appointed a Member of the Order of the British Empire (MBE) in the 2020 New Year Honours "for services to diversity and inclusion in the business community", while he was President of the Greater Birmingham Chamber of Commerce.

Bhatti also holds an honorary doctorate from Aston University in Business Administration.

References

External links

1985 births
Living people
UK MPs 2019–present
Conservative Party (UK) MPs for English constituencies
British politicians of Pakistani descent
English people of Pakistani descent
British accountants
Alumni of the London School of Economics
Members of the Order of the British Empire
People from Walsall